Akaiyan Lake is located in Glacier National Park, in the U. S. state of Montana. The lake is often ice-clogged and is  WSW of Sperry Glacier.

See also
List of lakes in Flathead County, Montana (A-L)

References

Lakes of Glacier National Park (U.S.)
Lakes of Flathead County, Montana